The fifth season of Objetivo Fama officially began on February 9, 2008. It was  hosted by Yuri. It featured returning judges Roberto Sueiro and Fernando Allende, while Mexican singer Jimena replaced Hilda Ramos.

Auditions

Final Cutdown
The 20 final contestants were officially announced on February 2, 2008, during a show at the Puerto Rico Convention Center and the show officially began on February 9, 2008. A few days before, contestant Lorenzo Mendez was disqualified from the show because he was already signed to a record label. Ronny Mercedes was selected to replace him.

The 20 selected contestants were:

* Age was taken at the beginning of the contest (2008)

Weekly Shows

Quarter-finals

First Show: February 9
The songs performed during the first show were:

The two contestants threatened that night were Sammy and Luz
The first show featured special presentations from Los Super Reyes and last year winner, Juan Vélez.
The better of the night:
Cristina Eustace y Jometh Andujar with a MAGISTERIAL interpretation of the difficult topic " Vive Ya" of the big singers Andrea Bocelli and Laura Pausini definitively these two guys are a few mounsters in scene. Jometh I captivate all during the WHOLE song but the moment mas impressive was his excellent acute one " PORQUE! " This boy is one of the more strong. Cristina safely incredible in the scene and very much scenic domain.

Samuel Colon, Jonathan Rios and Javier Baerga were the best second interpretation of the night with his excellent interpretation of the song " Solo Para Ti" of the acquaintance group "Camila"

Second Show: February 16
The songs performed during the second show were:

Luz was chosen to leave the competition
The two contestants threatened that night were Alfredo and Dalila
The show featured a special presentation from Ivy Queen

Third Show: February 23
The songs performed during the third show were:

Jonathan & Magdalena were chosen best of the night.
The contestants made a tribute to Mexican singer Emmanuel. He was invited as a guest judge and sang "La Chica de Humo" with the contestants.
Alfredo was chosen to leave the competition
The two contestants threatened that night were Luis Javier and Dalila

Fourth Show: March 1
The songs performed during the fourth show were:

Dalila was chosen to leave the competition
Cristina and Blanca were threatened to leave the competition
The show featured a special presentation from Alejandra Guzmán

Fifth Show: March 8
The songs performed during the fifth show were:

Blanca was chosen to leave the competition
Javier, Ronny and Magdalena were threatened to leave the competition
The show featured special presentations from Jenni Rivera and Yuridia

Sixth Show: March 15
The songs performed during the sixth show were:

Magdalena and Ronny were chosen to leave the competition
Luis Javier, Diana and Yaindhi were threatened to leave the competition
The show featured a special presentation from Gloria Trevi

Seventh Show: March 22
The songs performed during the seventh show were:

Diana and Luis Javier were chosen to leave the competition
The show featured a special presentation from Shaila Dúrcal

Eight Show: March 29
The songs performed during the eight show were:

Yaritza and Leonardo were chosen to leave the competition
The show featured a special presentation from Tito El Bambino

Semi-finals

Ninth Show: April 5
The songs performed during the ninth show were:

Josue was chosen to leave the competition
The show featured a special presentation from Marlon, winner of the third season of the show.

Tenth Show: April 12
The songs performed during the tenth show were:

Yerly was chosen to leave the competition

Eleventh Show: April 19
The songs performed during the eleventh show were:

Yaindhi and Milly Quezada sang together the song "Volvió Juanita"
Sammy G was chosen to leave the competition

Twelfth Show: April 26
The songs performed during the twelfth show were:

Jonathan, Javier and Jometh sang with MDO the songs "Otra Vez" and "No Queda Nada"
Samuel and Karen sang with Objetivo Fama's second season 1st runner up, Azucena Salazar, the song "Terco Pero Sabroso"
Cristina sang with Objetivo Fama's third season 4th runner up, Mary Ann Acevedo, the song "Fuera De Mi Vida"
Yaindhi sang with Objetivo Fama's fourth season semifinalist, Frances Marrero, the song "Herida"
Karen was chosen to leave the competition.

Thirteenth Show: May 3
The songs performed during the thirteenth show were:

The show featured special presentations from Alexis & Fido and Manny Manuel
Ex-contestants Ektor, Jayro, Gustavo and Victor sang together "Suavemente", from Elvis Crespo.
Yuri and fifth season contestants, Cristina, Leonardo and Luis Javier sang together "Y Volver, Volver"
Javier was chosen to leave the competition. He closed the show singing "La Puerta Se Cerro" by Luis Miguel

Fourteenth Show: May 10

The songs performed during the fourteenth show were:

The show started with the song "Color Esperanza", from Diego Torres, sung by the contestants with fourth season finalists, Iván, Victor and Nat.
The show featured a special presentation from Jowell y Randy
Jometh was chosen to leave the competition

Great Finale

Fifteenth Show: May 19
The great finale featured a red carpet where various celebrities marched on. All of the contestants, but one (19 in total) were present. Yaritza Rodriguez wasn't able to attend because of her mother's illness. The four finalists arrived on the back of convertible cars and signed autographs.

The show opened with the 4 finalists performing the song "Baila" from Kat DeLuna.

Each of the finalists performed two songs, one of them with one of their favorite celebrities. The songs performed during the finale were:

The show also featured special presentations from reggaeton duo Wisin & Yandel and Mexican singer, Lucero.

In the end, the finalists and winner were announced as follows:

Controversies
Some controversies that surfaced during the season.
 Contestant Magdalena León was dumped by her boyfriend during the show when, allegedly, she kissed several contestants at the studio/house.
 Contestant Diana Mercado was heavily criticized by fellow contestants Luis Javier Chávez and Yaindhi Alvarez, for not performing their duets as rehearsed resulting in unfavorable evaluations to the latter.
 Some feuds between Puerto Rican contestants Jonathan Ríos and Jometh Andujar rose during the final weeks. These were due to Jonathan not waking up in time during a weekend the group had in a hotel.
 A week before the final show, Yuri, who had served as host of the show for the past three years, was surprisingly fired by the producers. Apparently, Univision wasn't happy with the fact that she wouldn't be on time for the rehearsals for the final show. She has denied this and has said that she found out about the decision through an e-mail.
 The same week, allegations of fixes in the results grew heavier when a television ad appeared on YouTube showing the four finalists, two weeks prior to their selection. The advertisement was part of a product campaign for PepsiCo and the producers of the show have denied providing them with any voting result.

Objetivo Fama